Henry Townsend Building is a historic commercial/residential building located at Wilmington, New Castle County, Delaware. It was built in 1913–1914, and is a four-story, five bay commercial apartment building with a rectangular plan built of wall bearing brick construction.  It features a limestone facade with ornate denticulated cornice supported by four large brackets in the Beaux Arts style. Between 1922 and 1964, the first floor was used as a W. T. Grant Department Store.

It was added to the National Register of Historic Places in 1985.

References

Commercial buildings on the National Register of Historic Places in Delaware
Beaux-Arts architecture in Delaware
Commercial buildings completed in 1914
Buildings and structures in Wilmington, Delaware
Department stores on the National Register of Historic Places
National Register of Historic Places in Wilmington, Delaware